Langhorne Manor School, now known as Langhorne Manor Borough Hall, is a historic one-room school building located at Langhorne Manor, Bucks County, Pennsylvania. It was built in 1891, and is a small -story building with stone faced wood frame walls and a slate covered hipped roof in the Queen Anne style. It measures 33 feet wide by 43 feet deep. The roof features two eyelid dormers and a gable dormer with fishscale shingles. The school was converted to Borough Hall in 1959.

It was added to the National Register of Historic Places in 2008.

References

One-room schoolhouses in Pennsylvania
School buildings on the National Register of Historic Places in Pennsylvania
Queen Anne architecture in Pennsylvania
School buildings completed in 1891
Schools in Bucks County, Pennsylvania
National Register of Historic Places in Bucks County, Pennsylvania